Louisiana's 8th State Senate district is one of 39 districts in the Louisiana State Senate. It has been represented by Republican Patrick Connick since 2020, succeeding term-limited incumbent and Senate President John Alario. It is currently the most Democratic-leaning district in the Senate to be held by a Republican.

Geography
District 8 covers parts of Jefferson Parish and Plaquemines Parish in Greater New Orleans, including some or all of Gretna, Harvey, Westwego, Waggaman, Jean Lafitte, Port Sulphur, and Grand Isle.

The district overlaps with Louisiana's 1st and 2nd congressional districts, and with the 54th, 83rd, 84th, 85th, 87th, and 105th districts of the Louisiana House of Representatives.

Recent election results
Louisiana uses a jungle primary system. If no candidate receives 50% in the first round of voting, when all candidates appear on the same ballot regardless of party, the top-two finishers advance to a runoff election.

2019

2015

2011

Federal and statewide results in District 8

References

Louisiana State Senate districts
Jefferson Parish, Louisiana
Plaquemines Parish, Louisiana